The 2012 Air Force Falcons football team represented the United States Air Force Academy in the 2012 NCAA Division I FBS football season. The Falcons were led by sixth-year head coach Troy Calhoun and played their home games at Falcon Stadium. They were a member of the Mountain West Conference. They finished the season 6–7, 5–3 in Mountain West play to finish in fourth place. They were invited to the Armed Forces Bowl where they were defeated by Rice.

Schedule

Roster

Game summaries

Idaho State

at Michigan

at UNLV

Colorado State

Navy

at Wyoming

New Mexico

Nevada

at Army

at San Diego State

Hawaii

at Fresno State

Rice–Armed Forces Bowl

References

External links

Air Force
Air Force Falcons football seasons
Air Force Falcons football